Jan Overgaard (born 24 April 1973) is a former Danish cricketer.  Overgaard was a right-handed batsman.  He was born at Køge.

Overgaard made his List A debut for Denmark in international cricket in the 2000 ICC Emerging Nations Tournament against Zimbabwe A.  He played two further List A matches during the tournament against the Netherlands and Scotland.  In the same year he represented Denmark in the English domestic one-day competition, the NatWest Trophy against the Durham Cricket Board.  He represented Denmark in a further List A match which came against Suffolk in the 1st round of the 2002 Cheltenham & Gloucester Trophy, which was held in 2001.  In his 5 List A matches for Denmark, he scored 80 runs at a batting average of 20.00, with a single half century high score of 67*.

References

External links
Jan Overgaard at ESPNcricinfo
Jan Overgaard at CricketArchive

1973 births
Living people
People from Køge Municipality
Danish cricketers
Sportspeople from Region Zealand